Asperdaphne bitorquata is a species of sea snail, a marine gastropod mollusk in the family Raphitomidae.

Description
The length of the shell attains 4.5 mm, its diameter 2.5 mm.

This little, ovate shell is very dark brown, relieved by a pale zone between two white keels, crossed by dark-brown streaks. It contains 4½ subquadrate, angular whorls. The transverse lirae are pretty prominent, and the whole surface is roughened by minute laminae. The aperture is wide. The outer lip is arcuate with the posterior part slightly sinuate.

Distribution
This marine species is endemic to Australia and occurs off South Australia and Victoria.

References

External links
 

bitorquata
Gastropods described in 1896
Gastropods of Australia